This article lists the members of prime minister Omar Razzaz's cabinet. Razzaz assumed office on 4 June 2018. He was sworn in along with his cabinet on 14 June 2018.

Omar Razzaz's cabinet of ministers is composed of 28 ministers. The cabinet was formed throughout the first half of June 2018 following the resignation of the previous prime minister Hani Mulki, and officially sworn in on 14 June following a royal decree. Mulki's resignation was a result of widespread protests, which started on 30 May and were ignited by the proposed income tax bill. The new government has declared that the bill will be withdrawn from Parliament for further discussion.

Razzaz's cabinet was met with criticism due to the fact that 16 of 28 ministers remain unchanged from the preceding cabinet. Nevertheless, the cabinet holds 7 women, which is the largest representation of women that the country has seen.

On 20 June 2018, another royal decree was issued ordering the Jordanian Parliament to reconvene on 9 July for a special session so the new government can present its policy statement, which is required before a House vote of confidence can take place.  On 9 July, the policy statement was delivered before the lower house of parliament. The Razzaz government became official after it secured the required vote of confidence in the lower house on 19 July. On 10 October, Razzaz reshuffled his cabinet, merged a few ministries, and created one new ministry. Eight ministers were approved by royal decree on 11 October.

Cabinet Reshuffles

First cabinet: 20 June 2018 – 10 October 2018 
Razzaz's first cabinet members were appointed in June 2018. 16 out of 28 ministers remained unchanged from Hani Mulki's government.

Criticism 
Razzaz has received criticism from the public for having kept more than half of the ministers from the previous cabinet, and for not having included younger people.

First reshuffle: 10 October 2018 – 1 November 2018 
On Wednesday 10 October 2018, most ministers submitted their resignations as part of Razzaz's plan to reshuffle ministers, merge a few ministries, and create a new ministry. On Thursday 11 October 2018, a royal decree was issued approving the cabinet reshuffle.

Dead Sea Flash Floods 
As a result of the catastrophe which took place in the Dead Sea due to flash rains and claimed the lives of 21 people of which 18 schoolchildren, two ministers submitted their resignations on 1 November 2018 : Lina Annab – Minister of Tourism and Antiquities, and Azmi Mahafzeh – Minister of Education, Higher Education, and Scientific Research.  On 22 January 2019, their replacements were announced among a minor cabinet reshuffle. Walid Maani was appointed as Minister of Education and Minister of Higher Education, Walid Masri as Minister of Municipal Affairs, Majd Shweikeh as Minister of Tourism and Antiquities and Anmar Khasawneh as Minister of Transport.

Second reshuffle: November 2019 
This Cabinet reshuffle in Razzaz’s government is the fourth in one year after similar reshuffles took place in May and January 2019 and in October 2018. Nine new ministers were sworn in. 

A Royal Decree has also been issued accepting the resignation of the following, as of November 7, 2019: Rajai Muasher as deputy prime minister and minister of state, Abdul Nasser Abul Basal as minister of Awqaf and Islamic affairs, Ezzeddine Kanakrieh as minister of finance and Jumana Ghunaimat as minister of state for media affairs, Ibrahim Shahahdeh as minister of agriculture and minister of environment, Anmar Khasawneh as minister of transport, Mohammad Abu Rumman as minister of culture and minister of youth and Mohamad Al-Ississ as minister of planning and international cooperation and minister of state for economic affairs.

See also
2018 Jordanian protests
Omar Razzaz
Hani Mulki's cabinet

References 

Cabinets established in 2018
Cabinet of Jordan